23S rRNA pseudouridine955/2504/2580 synthase (RluC, pseudouridine synthase RluC) is an enzyme with systematic name 23S rRNA-uridine955/2504/2580 uracil mutase. This enzyme catalyses the following chemical reaction

 23S rRNA uridine955/uridine2504/uridine2580  23S rRNA pseudouridine955/pseudouridine2504/pseudouridine2580

The enzyme converts uridines at position 955, 2504 and 2580 of 23S rRNA to pseudouridines.

References

External links 
 

EC 5.4.99